Domariyaganj (formerly Domariaganj) is one of the 80 Lok Sabha (parliamentary) constituencies in the Indian state of Uttar Pradesh. This constituency covers the entire Siddharthnagar district.

Assembly segments
Presently, Domariyaganj Lok Sabha constituency comprises five Vidhan Sabha (legislative assembly) segments. These are:

Members of Parliament

Election Results

General election 2019

General election 2014

General election 2004

See also
 Siddharthnagar district
 List of Constituencies of the Lok Sabha
 Gauri, Siddharath Nagar

References

Siddharthnagar district
Lok Sabha constituencies in Uttar Pradesh